Selvey is a surname. Notable people with the surname include:

Mike Selvey (born 1948), English cricketer
Scotch Selvey (1863–1947), English footballer
Troy Selvey (born 1980), American basketball player
Walter Selvey (1866–1944), English footballer
Warwick Selvey (1939–2018), Australian shot putter and discus thrower